Mason Vicentino is a locality of the municipality of Colceresa in the province of Vicenza, Veneto, Italy. Via Braglio goes through it.
It was a municipality itself until February 20, 2019, after a referendum on December 16, 2018. The merging of the former municipalities of Mason and Molvena created the larger municipality of Colceresa.

Sources

External links
Mason Vicentino in Google in Google Maps

Cities and towns in Veneto